Guzowatka may refer to the following places:
Guzowatka, Kuyavian-Pomeranian Voivodeship (north-central Poland)
Guzowatka, Ostrołęka County in Masovian Voivodeship (east-central Poland)
Guzowatka, Wołomin County in Masovian Voivodeship (east-central Poland)